Philip Ayres may refer to:

 Philip Ayres (poet) (1638–1712), English poet
 Philip Burnard Ayres (1813–1863), British physician and botanist
 Philip James Ayres (1944–2021), Australian biographer